The Loop is the seventh album led by American jazz vibraphonist Johnny Lytle which was recorded in 1965 for the Tuba label.

Reception

The Allmusic site awarded the album 4 stars stating "this is one groovin' album in the vein of hard bop".

Track listing
All compositions by Johnny Lytle except as indicated
 "The Loop" - 2:18  
 "The More I See You" (Mack Gordon, Harry Warren) - 4:20  
 "The Man" - 2:42  
 "Time After Time" (Sammy Cahn, Jule Styne) - 4:28  
 "Big Bill" - 3:52  
 "Possum Grease" - 2:13  
 "Cristo Redentor" (Duke Pearson) - 4:44  
 "The Shyster" - 3:08  
 "My Romance" (Lorenz Hart, Richard Rodgers) - 4:02  
 "Hot Sauce" - 2:20

Personnel 
Johnny Lytle - vibraphone, marimba  
Wynton Kelly - piano (tracks 2-6, 8 & 9)
Milton Harris - organ (tracks 1 & 3-10)
Bob Cranshaw (tracks 2-5 & 7-9), George Duvivier (tracks 1, 6 & 10) - bass
William "Peppy" Hinnant - drums
Willie Rodriguez - congas

References 

1965 albums
Johnny Lytle albums
Albums produced by Orrin Keepnews